Raul Eshba (1944 – 27 September 1993) was an ethnic Abkhaz politician who was killed in Sukhumi along with Zhiuli Shartava, Guram Gabiskiria, Alexander Berulava and others by Abkhaz separatist rebels during the mass murder of Georgians in Abkhazia on 27 September 1993.

See also 
List of Georgians
Sukhumi Massacre

External links
Government of Abkhazia (-in-exile)
 (right-click to open file)

Assassinated Abkhazian politicians
Ethnic cleansing of Georgians in Abkhazia
1944 births
1993 deaths
Abkhazian murder victims
1993 in Georgia (country)
20th-century politicians from Georgia (country)